This is a list of members of the House of Commons who met at the Palace of Westminster between 14 June 1705 and 15 April 1708, initially as the House of Commons of England, then after the Acts of Union 1707 as the House of Commons of Great Britain.

Background
At the start of the eighteenth century the House of Commons of the Parliament of England had 513 members: 489 representing 245 constituencies in England and 24 representing 24 constituencies in Wales. In England there were 40 counties, returning two members each; 196 boroughs returning two members each, two boroughs (London and Weymouth and Melcombe Regis) returning four members each; five boroughs (Abingdon, Banbury, Bewdley, Higham Ferrers and Monmouth) returning one member each; and the two universities of Oxford and Cambridge returning two members each. In Wales there were twelve counties returning one member each, and twelve boroughs returning one member each.

The Commons of the second English Parliament of Queen Anne had been elected in May and June 1705. By proclamation of 29 April 1707 this parliament was declared to be the first Parliament of Great Britain. In February 1707 the shire commissioners and burgh commissioners of the last Parliament of Scotland in Edinburgh had elected 45 of their number (30 for the shires and 15 for the burghs) to represent Scotland in the House of Commons of Great Britain, and these new members took their seats at Westminster in November 1707. This brought the total number of Members of Parliament to 558, representing 314 constituencies. The Parliament was dissolved on 15 April 1708, triggering the first general election to the Parliament of Great Britain.

List of Members of Parliament

See also
1705 English general election

Sources
. 1879.
. 1988.
D. Hayton, E. Cruickshanks, and S. Handley eds, The History of Parliament: the House of Commons 1690-1715. 2002.

References

1705-08
Lists of Members of the Parliament of Great Britain